SS Egerland was an oil tanker used by the German Navy in World War II. In March 1941, it was decided to transfer ownership to the Texas Oil Company. In 1941, the tanker was requisitioned by the Kriegsmarine, renamed to Egerland and converted to a support ship of the Trossschiffverband der Kriegsmarine (Zweigstelle West) ("Naval Supply Ship Unit, Western Section") for naval operations in the Atlantic. On the first mission in June 1941, to support commerce raiding by the German battleship  and the cruiser , the ship encountered the British heavy cruiser  on 6 June and was scuttled to avoid capture.

Crew
The crew of the SS Egerland had a complement of 93 men. This was formed from 
 6 Kriegsmarine officer and 11 Merchant Marine officers.
 6 Kriegsmarine petty officers and 4 Merchant Marine petty officers
 45 men of the Kriegsmarine and 21 Merchant Marine.

Early history
By July 1940, SS North Africa had completed sea trials in the Baltic Sea.  In early 1941, SS Egerland sailed to Tallinn where the ship refuelled with Russian oil. While in Tallinn the crew had to stay on board as Russians had confiscated all the crews landing permits. North Africa then sailed to the Kiel naval port where it took on additional crew, who were Kriegsmarine sailors.

In March 1941 North Africa was renamed Egerland, left Kiel and sailed through the Kaiser Wilhelm Canal to Wilhelmshaven. Two days later on 19 March 1941, the ship sailed to the Hook of Holland  while in a convoy that consisted of two  whalers, one acting in the capacity as a patrol boat, the other as a submarine chaser. Two days later it sailed for Cherbourg again in convoy with three minesweepers. Upon arrival in Cherbourg it was bombed and it used up all its anti-aircraft ammunition which consisted of 2000 2 cm shells. She subsequently sailed to Saint-Nazaire and reached her destination on 25 March 1941. During that leg of her journey the ship was attacked by a British submarine while close to Brest and two torpedoes passed within 50 yards of the ship.

First and last cruise
On the 25 March the Egerland sailed from Saint-Nazaire on a bearing that would intersect with the Azores. On leaving Saint-Nazaire the ship was escorted by two corvettes for 36 hours and then air cover was subsequently provided by Heinkel floatplane aircraft for another 12 hours. Once the ship reached the 30th meridian west, it sailed south until by the 7 May it had reached 10° N, 31° W. On the day of 8 May the ship rendezvoused with the tanker MV Brake and took over the Brakes patrol. The Brakes supply of torpedoes were transferred to the Egerland.

Refuelling
On the night of the same day the Egerland sighted the U-boat U-107. On 9 May at 0730  Egerland started to refuel U-109 which took several hours. Günter Hessler, the Kriegsmarine Fregattenkapitän in command of  U-107 requested a large number of torpedoes be transferred as all the U-boats torpedoes has been used. For the few hours while the submarine was being refuelled, the sailors were entertained on the Egerland and this included imbibing beer and cigarettes as well as watching a film.

On the 11 May, Egerland met U-38 at 7° N, 30° W but the refuelling operation was interrupted when a convoy was sighted. On the day after it rendezvoused with either U-37 or U-103 as this was commanded by Victor Schütze. On the morning of 13 May at position 7° N, 31° W, the submarine was refuelled. Later on the same day and one hundred and fifty miles south, U-38 was sighted and refuelling recommenced. On the evening of 13 May a British submarine was sighted in the area, so the captain decided to make an attempt to disguise the ship by renaming the ship Gallia-Colon in the colours of the Panamanian flag. On the night of  15/16  Egerland refuelled and resupplied U-106. By 17 May, Egerland had sailed somewhere between the 6th parallel and 7th parallel north. Two days later on 19 May a patient was transferred to Egerland from U-105 as a result of action between the submarine and a British vessel;  the patient was operated on immediately. On the same day Egerland encountered U-69 and it was subsequently resupplied and refuelled.

By the following day, 20 May, the ship had sailed 200 miles south. On 28 May Egerland rendezvoused with the submarine UA. From the diary of the Egerland it is known that the UA had apparently submerged while its exhaust was still open and sea water had ingressed and mixed with the lubricating oil. After the  mixture was pumped out, the Egerland supplied seven tons of oil.

Scuttling and destruction
The orders were to take on some torpedoes.

On the morning of 6 June Egerland encountered the heavy cruiser  and the destroyer  which, guided by Enigma intelligence were looking for German supply ships. To buy some time to enable the ship to be scuttled the Egerland signalled that she was the Panamanian vessel Gallia.

The crew fired scuttling charges before abandoning ship. A Royal Navy party boarded Egerland but assessed it as unsalvageable and it was decided to finish the scuttling. According to the diary of   the Egerland proved very difficult to sink and the gunfire on the ship had no effect. The cruiser fired six depth charges while sailing past the Egerland but these did not sink the ship. A torpedo fired at the tanker caused extensive damage and left it listing at the stern. Finally one of the depth charges that had landed amidships detonated and the ship sank at 1530 hours on 5 June 1941.

London and Brilliant had found Esso Hamburg on 4 June and it too had been scuttled. London intercepted another supply ship, the Babitonga on 21 June which was scuttled.

Notes

References

1940 ships
Ships built in Hamburg
Auxiliary ships of the Kriegsmarine
Maritime incidents in June 1941